Moldovan Americans are Americans who are from Moldova or are descended from Moldovans. According to the U.S. 2000 census, there were 7,859 Moldovan Americans in the United States. However, the American Community Survey indicated that the number of people of Moldovan origin greatly increased over the years, and in 2014 exceeded 40,000 people in the United States. Most Moldovan Americans are Eastern Orthodox.

Demographics 
In the 2010 U.S. census and subsequently, the largest part of the population born in Moldova self-identified as being of Romanian ancestry. The 2015 U.S. Census Bureau estimate results based on population surveys show 20,128 people born in the Republic of Moldova who identified themselves as being of "Romanian ancestry". However, many other Moldovan-born people were of other ancestries. In 2015, 7,968 of them declared themselves to be of "Russian ancestry", probably including some Russian-speaking Jews, 3,747 declared themselves to be of Ukrainian ancestry, 332 declared themselves to be of Bulgarian ancestry, and 126 declared themselves to be of Turkish ancestry. No inhabitants of the U.S. declared a Gagauz ancestry in the 2020 census. The number of people originating from Moldova who indicated Polish ancestry was 228, while 126 declared German ancestry, 43 declared Israeli ancestry, and 196 declared "European" ancestry. The 2015 data and other sources suggest that it is likely that about 8,000 residents of the United States identify themselves for census purposes as being of "Moldovan ancestry", but no exact numbers have been made available. This figure includes a number of Jews, given the fact that there is no Jewish ancestry category. Those who self-identify as being of "Moldovan ancestry" are outnumbered by more than two to one by those originating from Moldova who declare a "Romanian ancestry".

Moldovan communities exist in cities such as Asheville, New York and Washington, D.C. Moldovans have Moldovan food restaurants in the United States, in places such as New York City.

Most Moldovan Americans are Eastern Orthodox,  and attend overwhelmingly ethnic Romanian parishes of the Orthodox Church of America.

Statistics
Moldova-born population in the US since 2010:

Associations 
Several Moldovan associations can be found in the United States, such as the "Moldova for Democracy and Development" and "Grigore Vieru" organizations in Brooklyn, New York. Another important Moldovan association is "The Moldova Foundation", a non-profit organization established in Washington, D.C. in 2003, whose main goal is to support people in Moldova and to encourage them to establish economic reforms and a democratic system in the country (which would include "freedom of speech, pluralism and private initiative"), through support of the United States and the European Union.

Notable people
 Roman Borvanov
 George de Bothezat
 Xenia Deli
 Daniella Karagach
 Aleksandr Kogan
 Isaak Shvartsev
 Max Vangeli
 Sam Zemurray
 Jonathan Cheban
 Bianna Golodryga
 Valery Gaina

Moldovan-Jewish
Notable Americans of Moldovan-Jewish descent.

 Boris Anisfeld
 Samuel Bronston
 Italo Jose Dejter
 Jared Diamond
 Ari Emanuel
 Ezekiel Emanuel
 Rahm Emanuel
 Ed Feingersh
 Louis Filler
 George Finkel
 Maurice Herman Finkel
 William F. Friedman
 Prince Alexander von Fürstenberg
 Diane von Fürstenberg
 Princess Tatiana von Fürstenberg
 Ben Gold
 Bianna Golodryga
 Frederick Irving
 Mona May Karff
 Boris Kolker
 Lee Krasner
 Lewis Milestone
 Saul Perlmutter
 Steven Pinker
 Vera Rubin
 Morris Swadesh
 Orly Taitz
 Henry Waxman
 Maria Winetzkaja
 Sam Zemurray

See also 
 North Carolina–Moldova National Guard Partnership
 Moldova–United States relations
 European Americans
 Romanian Americans
 Russian Americans

References 

 
 
Moldovan diaspora
European-American society